"I Wanna Remember This" is a song written by Jennifer Kimball and Annie Roboff, and recorded by American country music artist Linda Davis.  It was released in May 1998 and as included on the soundtrack to the 1998 film Black Dog. The song reached number 20 on the Billboard Hot Country Singles & Tracks chart.

Music video
The music video was directed by John Miller and R. Brad Murano and premiered in April 1998.

Chart performance

References

1998 singles
1998 songs
Linda Davis songs
Decca Records singles
Songs written by Jennifer Kimball
Song recordings produced by James Stroud
Songs written by Annie Roboff